Dames Making Games (DMG) is a Toronto-based non-profit organization that provides resources for female interested in the gaming development industry. Providing resources and hosting workshops, Dames Making Games aims to create a comfortable platform for women, non-binary, femme and queer people in the creation of video games.

History 
Dames Making Games' origins can be traced to a 2011 program held by TIFF Nexus called “The Difference Engine Initiative,” also held in collaboration with the Hand Eye Society, to help educate young women in game creation. The co-founder Cecily Craver, inspired by her experience in the program thought of creating a platform to diversify the demographic of people in the game developing industry. Sparking the name Dames Making Games, Craver recruited Jennie Faber to help host meetings. Soon after Alex Leitch was recruited to help with the creation of DMG. Since being founded in 2012, the group has held workshops, game jams, socials and other events aiming to educate and support gender-diverse gamers, citing the male-dominated culture of gaming as a barrier faced by many would-be gamers. DMG's goals also include diversifying the depiction of gender in games to better reflect the breadth of human experience. In 2015 and 2016, the group collaborated in organizing Indigicade, a video-game development initiative aimed at Indigenous girls and women. Support from the organization is volunteer based and are accepting donations.

Challenges 
In their early years, DMG had a small group of supporters ranging around 30 to 40 member by 2013.  As Dames Making Games grew, various criticism in the organization's purpose and benefits. Primarily men within gaming would mention that there is not need for female involvement in gaming.Additionally, mentioning that the organization does not have a strong goal in mind for their community. DMG retaliates by stating helping and providing resources for other women in gaming is also considered a goal. Striving for togetherness and support, DMG looks to change the direction of gaming.

Programs/Events

Damage Camp 
Lasting about a month long, Dames Making Games host Damage Camp, an event consisting of workshops and discussion panels, with guest speakers talking about a variety of topics related to females in gaming. Topics include, creating an inclusive environment for video game developers, gaining financial stability in the industry, and the incorporation of different minority groups within the gaming community.  This event is made available to the general public and no membership is needed to register.

New Game Makers 
In part of DMG's Fall speaker series, New Game Makers is a workshop that introduces those who are new to game developing and supply them with tools to get started.  Craver first person to introduce the first event and regularly kept in mind progressive methods of developing games. This workshop touches on how to manage free and cross-performing software.

See also
Women in computing in Canada
Black Girls Code
Native Girls Code
Women Who Code
Pixelles

References

External links
 
 Twitter

Organizations based in Toronto
Women's organizations based in Canada
Women in computing
Women and video games
Video game organizations
Women in Ontario